Trois is the debut album by Japanese rock band Dustz, released on December 14, 2011. The album's title is taken from the French word for the number three, as the band consists of three members who are fluent in three languages: Japanese, French, and English. The album will feature the band's four major release singles "Break & Peace", "Brilliant Day", "Criez", and "spiral". Trois will also include a cover of Dragon Ash's "Fantasista", with guest musicians Wes Borland and John Otto of Limp Bizkit.

Track listing

References

2011 debut albums
Dustz albums